This is a comprehensive discography of Carcass, an extreme metal band from England, who formed in 1985 and disbanded in 1996. The band reformed in 2007 without one of its original members, drummer Ken Owen, due to health reasons. To date, the band have released seven studio albums, two compilation albums, five EPs, two demo albums, one video album, and seven music videos.

Studio albums

Compilation albums

EPs

Demo albums

Video albums

Music videos

References 

Heavy metal group discographies
Discographies of British artists